The Thirty-first Dynasty of Egypt (notated Dynasty XXXI, alternatively 31st Dynasty or Dynasty 31), also known as the Second Egyptian Satrapy, was effectively a satrapy of the Achaemenid Persian Empire between 343 BC to 332 BC. It was founded by Artaxerxes III, the King of Persia, after his reconquest of Egypt and subsequent crowning as Pharaoh of Egypt, and was disestablished upon the conquest of Egypt by Alexander the Great.

The period of the 31st Dynasty was the second occasion in which Persian pharaohs ruled Egypt, hence the term "Second Egyptian Satrapy". Before the 31st Dynasty was founded, Egypt had enjoyed a brief period of independence, during which three indigenous dynasties reigned (the 28th, 29th, and 30th dynasties). The period before this is referred to as the "First Egyptian Satrapy" or the 27th Dynasty (525–404 BC).

History

First Egyptian Campaign
In around 351 BC, Artaxerxes embarked on a campaign to recover Egypt, which had revolted under his father, Artaxerxes II. At the same time, a rebellion had broken out in Asia Minor, which, being supported by Thebes, threatened to become serious. Levying a vast army, Artaxerxes marched into Egypt, and engaged Nectanebo II. After a year of fighting the Egyptian Pharaoh, Nectanebo inflicted a crushing defeat on the Persians with the support of mercenaries led by the Greek generals Diophantus and Lamius. Artaxerxes was compelled to retreat and postpone his plans to reconquer Egypt.

Second Egyptian Campaign

In 343 BC, Artaxerxes, in addition to his 330,000 Persians, had now a force of 14,000 Greeks furnished by the Greek cities of Asia Minor: 4,000 under Mentor, consisting of the troops which he had brought to the aid of Tennes from Egypt; 3,000 sent by Argos; and 1000 from Thebes. He divided these troops into three bodies, and placed at the head of each a Persian and a Greek. The Greek commanders were Lacrates of Thebes, Mentor of Rhodes and Nicostratus of Argos while the Persians were led by Rhossaces, Aristazanes, and Bagoas, the chief of the eunuchs. Nectanebo II resisted with an army of 100,000 of whom 20,000 were Greek mercenaries. Nectanebo II occupied the Nile and its various branches with his large navy. The character of the country, intersected by numerous canals, and full of strongly fortified towns, was in his favour and Nectanebo II might have been expected to offer a prolonged, if not even a successful, resistance.  But he lacked good generals, and over-confident in his own powers of command, he found himself out-manoeuvered by the Greek mercenary generals. His forces were defeated by the combined Persian armies near Pelusium.

After his defeat, Nectanebo hastily fled to Memphis, leaving the fortified towns to be defended by their garrisons. These garrisons consisted of partly Greek and partly Egyptian troops, between whom jealousies and suspicions were easily sown by the Persian leaders. As a result, the Persians were able to rapidly defeat numerous towns across Lower Egypt and were advancing upon Memphis when Nectanebo decided to quit the country and flee southwards to Ethiopia. The Persian army then completely routed the Egyptians and occupied the Lower Delta of the Nile. Following Nectanebo's flight to Ethiopia, all of Egypt submitted to Artaxerxes. The Jews in Egypt were sent either to Babylon or to the south coast of the Caspian Sea, the same location where the Jews of Phoenicia had earlier been sent.

After this victory over the Egyptians, Artaxerxes had the city walls destroyed, started a reign of terror, and set about looting all the temples. Persia gained a significant amount of wealth from this looting. Artaxerxes also imposed high taxes and attempted to weaken Egypt enough that it could never revolt against Persia again. During the 10 years that Persia controlled Egypt, believers in the native religion were persecuted and sacred books were stolen. Before he returned to Persia, he appointed Pherendares as satrap of Egypt. With the wealth gained from his reconquest of Egypt, Artaxerxes was able to amply reward his mercenaries. He then returned to his capital, having successfully completed his invasion and occupation of Egypt.

Satrapal rule in Egypt

It is not known who served as satrap after Artaxerxes III, but Pherendates II was an early satrap of Egypt. Under Darius III (336–330 BC) there was Sabaces, who fought and died at Issus and was succeeded by Mazaces. Egyptians also fought at Issus, for example, the nobleman Somtutefnekhet of Heracleopolis, who described on the "Naples stele" how he escaped during the battle against the Greeks and how Arsaphes, the god of his city, protected him and allowed him to return home.

In 332 BC, Mazaces handed over the country to Alexander the Great without a fight. The Achaemenid empire had ended, and for a while Egypt was a satrapy in Alexander's empire. Later the Ptolemies and the Romans successively ruled the Nile valley.

Culture

Occasionally Egyptians wore foreign costumes and jewelry. The taste for non-Egyptian fashion arose during periods of extensive trade or diplomatic contact with distant courts, or when Egypt was controlled by a foreign power. The Persians, who twice invaded the Nile Valley from their Iranian homeland, dominated Egypt during Dynasty 27 (525–404 BC) and Dynasty 31 (342–332 BC). This statue to the left dates to the later period of Persian rule in Egypt.

According to the Brooklyn Museum, "the long skirt shown wrapped around this statue's body and tucked in at the upper edge of the garment is typically Persian. The necklace, called a torque, is decorated with images of ibexes, symbols in ancient Persia of agility and sexual prowess. The depiction of this official in Persian dress may have been a demonstration of loyalty to the new rulers."

Coinage

Achaemenid Egyptian coinage

Cilician coinage with Achaemenid rulers as Pharaohs

Pharaohs of the 31st Dynasty

Timeline of the 31st Dynasty (Achaemenid Pharaohs only)

Satraps of the 31st Dynasty

Sources
 Fragments of Ctesias (Persica) 
 Diodorus Siculus (Bibliotheca historica)
 Fragments of Manetho (Aegyptiaca)
 Flavius Josephus (Antiquities of the Jews)

See also
 Twenty-seventh Dynasty of Egypt (525 BC−404 BC), also known as the First Egyptian Satrapy.
 Sassanid conquest of Egypt

References

External links
 
 

 
States and territories established in the 4th century BC
States and territories disestablished in the 4th century BC
31
31
Achaemenid satrapies
4th century BC in Egypt
340s BC
330s BC
340s BC establishments
4th-century BC establishments in Egypt
4th-century BC disestablishments in Egypt